The published musical compositions of Percy Grainger (1882–1961) fall into two main categories: (a) original works and (b) folksong settings. There are also numerous unpublished works, sketches and juvenilia. Grainger's compositional career lasted for more than half a century, from the end of the 19th century until the middle 1950s. Works tended to be written concurrently, and were often developed over very long periods of time—in some cases extending to several decades—before eventual publication. Many of the compositions exist in a number of different versions, some of which refer to "elastic scoring", a means which permits performances by undefined musical forces ranging from small instrumental groups to full orchestra.

Publication dates refer to the first publications of individual works, although Grainger often continued to revise and prepare new versions of works long after their initial publication. The lists below do not represent a full record of Grainger's compositional work. Grainger's biographer John Bird has referred to the near-impossibility of cataloguing all of the composer's work, bearing in mind that "[h]is original compositions are scattered to the four corners of the earth". In the mid-1970s the Grainger Museum in Melbourne began the work of rationalising and cataloguing its large collection of Grainger manuscripts, and published its initial results in 1978. Grainger also made many arrangements of other composers' works, which are not listed here.

Collections
Grainger assembled many of his works under generic collection headings:
American Folk-music Settings (AFMS)
British Folk-music Settings (BFMS)
Danish Folk-music collection (DFMS)
Kipling Jungle Book Cycle (KJBC)
Kipling Settings (KS)
Room-music Tit-bits (RMTB)
Sea Chanty Settings (SCS)
Sentimentals (S)
Settings of Dance - Folksongs from the Faeroe Islands (SDFFI)
Settings of Songs and Tunes from William Chappell's "Old English Popular Music". (OEPM)

Original works

Folksong adaptations and arrangements

Hitherto unpublished works now published (original composition and arrangements)

Unpublished incomplete sketches and juvenilia (some now published)

References

Sources

Footnotes

Grainger